Catherine Campbell Stewart (née Sword, 15 August 1881 – 2 April 1957) was a New Zealand politician of the Labour Party.

Early life
Born in Glasgow, she migrated with her family to New Zealand in 1921. She was an ardent suffragette, and a member of the Theosophical Society. At Labour's 1938 conference Stewart stated "I am not speaking as a feminist but as a woman who wishes to stand shoulder to shoulder with our men" in her acceptance to stand as a party candidate.

Political career

She was the second woman to be elected to Parliament after Elizabeth McCombs and first to enter parliament as a result of a general election. Stewart saw herself as the "Member for Everywoman" and felt obliged to concentrate on issues in the interests of women, children and those in need. In 1941, she was joined by Mary Dreaver, also of the Labour party, bringing the total of female MPs to two.

This was seen as a result of public vilification due to two of her sons, who were conscientious objectors during World War II. Later she was unsuccessfully nominated for a position on the New Zealand Legislative Council by Labour’s Karori branch in her old electorate.

In both 1941 and 1944 she unsuccessfully stood for the Wellington City Council on a Labour Party ticket. Both elections saw all Labour candidates defeated.

After the death of her husband Charles in 1948, she returned to live in Glasgow, where she died on 2 April 1957.

References

Women in Parliamentary Life 1970-1990: Hocken Lecture 1993 by Marilyn Waring, page 35-36 (Hocken Library, University of Otago, 1994) 

1881 births
1957 deaths
New Zealand Labour Party MPs
Women members of the New Zealand House of Representatives
Politicians from Glasgow
New Zealand suffragists
Scottish emigrants to New Zealand
Unsuccessful candidates in the 1943 New Zealand general election
Members of the New Zealand House of Representatives
New Zealand MPs for Wellington electorates
20th-century New Zealand women politicians
20th-century New Zealand politicians